Emilio García Martínez (12 September 1912 – 30 March 1977), commonly known as Emilín, was a Spanish footballer who played as a forward.

Club career
Born in San Román, Candamo, Asturias, Emílin graduated from Real Oviedo's youth setup. He made his senior debut in 1931, aged 19, and soon established himself as a regular figure in the club.

At Oviedo Emilín was part of the celebrated Delantera Eléctrica ("the electric forwards"), a forward line of lightning quick youthful talent that steam-rolled teams with high tempo highly skilled play; but for the onset of war the team would have surely improved upon the two third places in the seasons that preceded the war. He had an enviable technique and was famous for his corners so that he managed to score a number of goals direct from the corner, today called Olympic goals.

Emilín played 277 games for Real Oviedo, 227 of them in La Liga, scoring 64 goals, being the sixth best scorer in the Azules history. He subsequently represented FC Barcelona and Sporting de Gijón, retiring with the latter in 1951, aged 39.

International career
Emilín was capped twice with Spain's main squad, all of them in 1942.

References

1912 births
1977 deaths
Spanish footballers
Footballers from Asturias
Association football forwards
La Liga players
Segunda División players
Real Oviedo players
FC Barcelona players
Sporting de Gijón players
Spain international footballers